Transtillaspis quatrocornuta is a species of moth of the family Tortricidae. It is found in Pichincha Province, Ecuador.

The wingspan is about 15 mm.  The ground colour of the forewings is greyish cream with a brownish admixture and suffusions. The dots and strigulae (fine streaks) are brownish grey and brown. The hindwings are whitish cream, somewhat tinged with grey and with grey strigulae.

Etymology
The species name refers to the presence of four cornuti.

References

Moths described in 2008
Transtillaspis
Taxa named by Józef Razowski